The Fleming Award is an environmental science award bestowed every three years by the Royal Society of New Zealand, which recognises "protection, maintenance, management, improvement or understanding of the environment, in particular the sustainable management of the New Zealand environment". It comprises a medal, a cash prize, and a public lecture tour in the year following the award.

The award was established in 1988 to commemorate the life and work of conservationist, scientist, and former President of the RSNZ Sir Charles Fleming.

Recipients
Source: Royal Society of New Zealand

 1989: Don Merton and the Royal Forest and Bird Protection Society of New Zealand
 1992: Ian A. E. Atkinson
 1995: Brian Molloy
 1998: David A. Thom
 2001: John Craig
 2004: Stephen Dawson and Elisabeth Slooten (jointly)
 2007: Mick Clout
 2010: Sir Alan Mark
 2013: Mike Joy
 2016: Bruce Clarkson
 2019: David Towns
 2022: Ann Brower

See also

 List of environmental awards

References

Environmental awards
New Zealand science and technology awards
Royal Society of New Zealand
1988 establishments in New Zealand